Da Game Is to Be Sold, Not to Be Told is the third studio album by American rapper Snoop Dogg (his first without the Doggy in the middle of the name). It was released on August 4, 1998, by No Limit Records and Priority Records. It is his first album following his departure from Death Row Records in early 1998. It is the first Snoop Dogg album to have notable affiliates such as Dr. Dre, Nate Dogg, Warren G and others absent. It was also his first album to be released under a slight change to his stage name "Snoop Dogg" for contractual reasons.

Background 

In September 1996, shortly before the release of Snoop's second album Tha Doggfather, his friend and label-mate at Death Row Records, Tupac Shakur, was murdered in a drive-by shooting that many fans and other rappers believed to be a part of rising tensions between the East and West Coast hip hop scenes.

In March 1997, noted East Coast rapper The Notorious B.I.G., popularly known as "Biggie", was also murdered in a drive-by shooting which was attributed by fans to the tensions between the coastal hip hop scenes.

Snoop Dogg began to fear for his own safety due to the murders of Tupac and Biggie and also because Death Row Records was acknowledged by its artists in retrospect to be an unprofessional place during this time, with label founder Suge Knight incarcerated and many people with criminal pasts associated with the label.

In 1997, No Limit rapper Mystikal invited Snoop to be on his record Unpredictable on a song called "Gangstas" with label head Master P.

Snoop developed a good relationship with the No Limit rappers, and after another guest appearance on No Limit artist Silkk the Shocker's LP, Snoop was reported to have been signed to No Limit by Master P in March 1998. Snoop said at the time that "Snoop Dogg is universal so he can fit into any camp-especially a camp that knows how to handmake shit[;] [a]nd, No Limit hand makes material. They make material fittin' to the artist and they know what type of shit Snoop Dogg is supposed to be on. That's why it's so tight." [sic]

Singles 

The lead single, "Still a G Thang," was released on July 3, 1998. It was produced by Meech Wells. It is the sequel to the 1992 hit single "Nuthin' but a 'G' Thang", which appears on Dr. Dre's debut solo album, The Chronic (1992). The song debuted at number 26 on the US Billboard Hot 100, marking the first Hot 100 entry as lead artist by Snoop since "Gin and Juice," in 1994. The song peaked at number 19 on the chart.

The second single, "Woof," featuring Mystikal and Fiend peaked at number 62 on the Billboard Hot 100.

Critical reception

The album featured mostly No Limit artists and was a departure from Snoop Dogg's first two albums which were strictly West Coast.
Unlike his two previous two studio albums, Da Game Is to Be Sold, Not to Be Told received generally negative to moderate reviews. Q gave the album 3 out of 5 stars, saying, "Dogg's vocals can actually verge on the sublime....in glorious slow motion, and the undercurrent vibe is distinctly soulful."

The Source gave it 3.5 Mics out of 5, saying, "[f]ew MCs from the West have ever gotten as much acceptance and acclaim from outside regions... No Limit's latest soldier isn't trying to rock the boat with his third album... the vibrant vocalist is very happy to be with rap's top squad."

Anthony DeCurtis of Rolling Stone gave the album 2 out of 5 stars, saying that Snoop's work lacked the confidence and originality displayed on his earlier albums.

Commercial performance 
Da Game Is to Be Sold, Not to Be Told debuted at number one on the US Billboard 200 chart, selling 520,000 copies in its first week. It is Snoop Dogg's third consecutive number-one album in the United States. In its second week, the album remained at top on the Billboard 200, selling 246,000 copies. The album spent five consecutive weeks on the top ten of the Billboard 200. The album was certified 2× Platinum on October 22, 1998. On November 18, 1998, the album had sold 1.7 million copies in the United States, ranking as the 39th best-selling album of the year. As of March 2008, the album had sold over 2 million copies in the United States, making it the second best-selling album by Snoop Dogg in the country, behind only Doggystyle (1993).

Track listing

Charts

Weekly charts

Year-end charts

Certifications

See also 
 Number-one albums of 1998 (U.S.)
 List of number-one R&B albums of 1998 (U.S.)

Notes

References 

 Music Video Database
 Top 40 Charts
 Clipland
 Weekly Wire review
 Launch review
 Slumz of Boxden

1998 albums
Snoop Dogg albums
Priority Records albums
No Limit Records albums
Albums produced by DJ Pooh
Albums produced by Soopafly